Hollymount is an unincorporated community in Sussex County, Delaware United States. It is one of the Three Sisters communities consisting of Fairmount, Hollyville, and Hollymount. Hollymount is the area located around the intersections of Delaware Route 23 and Delaware Route 24 Alternate (Sussex County Road 48).

The community is part of the Salisbury, Maryland-Delaware Metropolitan Statistical Area.

Unincorporated communities in Sussex County, Delaware
Unincorporated communities in Delaware